Purvis Jennings "Jim" Ferree (June 10, 1931 – March 14, 2023) was an American professional golfer who played on the PGA Tour and the Senior PGA Tour.

Born in Pinebluff, North Carolina, Ferree grew up in Winston-Salem and graduated from  Reynolds High School. He learned the game of golf from his father, Purvis, long-time pro at Winston-Salem's Old Town Golf Club. Ferree played college golf at the University of North Carolina in Chapel Hill. Following service in the U.S. Army, he turned professional in late 1955.

Ferree had one PGA Tour win during his regular career years. He was regarded as one of the very best in the game in the tee-to-green ball-striking phase of the game, but putting was always his weakness. He spent most of his thirties and forties as the director of golf at Long Cove Club in Hilton Head, South Carolina.

Ferree was later a club pro and joined the Senior PGA Tour at age fifty in 1981. He was chosen by PGA Commissioner Deane Beman to be the model for the knickers-wearing player on the Senior Tour's logo. He shares the Georgia-Pacific Grand Champions record for most victories (9) with two other golfers. He was the Senior PGA Tour's Comeback Player of the Year in 1993.

In 1991, he became the first golfer inducted into the University of North Carolina's Hall of Fame. He lived in Hilton Head, South Carolina with his wife, Karen, also a former champion golfer.

Ferree died on March 14, 2023, at the age of 91.

Professional wins (19)

PGA Tour wins (1)

Other wins (12)
this list is probably incomplete
1954 Forsyth County tournament
1955 Forsyth County tournament
1958 British Columbia Centennial Open
1961 Jamaica Open
1962 Panama Open
1963 Maracaibo Open Invitational
1966 Carolinas PGA Championship
1967 Georgia PGA Championship
1977 Tri-State Open
1978 Tri-State PGA Championship
1981 Tri-State PGA Championship
1983 Tri-State Open

Senior PGA Tour wins (2)

Senior PGA Tour playoff record (1–3)

Other senior wins (4)
this list is probably incomplete
1997 Liberty Mutual Legends of Golf - Demaret Division (with George Bayer)
2002 Liberty Mutual Legends of Golf - Demaret Division (with Miller Barber)
2003 Liberty Mutual Legends of Golf - Demaret Division (with Miller Barber)
2006 Grand Champions team better-ball (with Jack Fleck)

U.S. national team appearances
PGA Cup: 1979

Video
YouTube – Jim Ferree interview (2014)

References

External links

Carolinas Golf Hall of Fame – Jim Ferree

American male golfers
North Carolina Tar Heels men's golfers
PGA Tour golfers
PGA Tour Champions golfers
Golfers from North Carolina
Sportspeople from Winston-Salem, North Carolina
People from Hilton Head, South Carolina
1931 births
2023 deaths